Cable in the Classroom was an American division of the National Cable & Telecommunications Association that assisted the cable television industry in providing educational content to schools. The organization was founded in 1989. A Canadian organization, also called "Cable in the Classroom" ("La câblo-éducation" in French), was founded in 1995, and held the same scope as the US organization.

Cable stations broadcast educational television programs at specific times (usually early in the morning) commercial-free and notified Cable in the Classroom as to when the shows would air, which maintained a master list for educators to reference. This way, educators were able to record the programs for free and use them in school as learning tools for children. Copyrights were cleared so that educators could use the content of the listed programs as they wished for their syllabus and learning plans.

Over the years however, many networks discontinued any effort at promoting Cable in the Classroom or setting aside programming for the organization's purposes, ceding more to direct marketing of their educational television programming to teachers and school districts via their home video departments, their Internet sites, or in the cases of networks such as ABC Family, Disney Channel and Cartoon Network, removing their involvement altogether, commensurate with the Internet ending other cable services tied to traditional scheduling such as "near video on demand". Another factor was likely the decline in VHS recorders, as DVRs with non-portable storage became the recording format of choice over DVD recorders, the equivalent successor to VCRs. Streaming video also played a factor in the reduction of Cable in the Classroom, as educators can now access and play content at any time via computers connected to in-classroom televisions and video projectors rather than on a set schedule.

In 2014, Cable in the Classroom was entirely discontinued in the United States with CNN Student News the only program left under the effort, and the NCTA redirected the former Cable in the Classroom portal to promote their "Cable Impacts Foundation" charity arm instead. The Canadian effort ended as vertically integrated cable and satellite providers purchased networks and campaigned successfully for the CRTC to relax Canadian content restrictions that defined them to schedule programming in a certain manner, including educational programming.

Programs
The following is an example of a number programs used for "Cable in the Classroom"
A&E Classroom - A&E
A Little Curious - HBO Family
CNN Student News - HLN
Classroom Discovery - Discovery Channel
Crashbox - HBO Family
Dora the Explorer - Nickelodeon
History Channel Classroom - History
El canal de la historia (Spanish-dubbed programs)
Chaîne historique (French-dubbed programs)
How It's Made - Discovery Channel/Science Channel
Jep! - Game Show Network
Kids' Court - Nickelodeon
Little Einsteins - Disney Channel 
MTV News specials and documentaries - MTV
Mr. Wizard's World - NickelodeonNick News - NickelodeonNickelodeon Launch Box - NickelodeonSpecial Agent Oso - Disney ChannelThe Weather Classroom - The Weather Channel
 Certain episodes of The Twilight Zone - SyfyWheel 2000 - Game Show NetworkZap!'' - Nickelodeon

See also 

 Channel One News - first a satellite, later an Internet streaming video service offering a newscast designed for classroom use

1989 establishments in the United States
2014 disestablishments in the United States
Educational television
Non-profit organizations based in Washington, D.C.
Non-profit organizations based in Canada
Cable television in the United States
Cable television in Canada
Organizations established in 1989